Anixia wallrothii is a species of fungus belonging to the Anixia genus. It was documented in 1870 by German mycologist Karl Wilhelm Gottlieb Leopold Fuckel.

References  

Agaricomycetes
Fungi described in 1870
Taxa named by Karl Wilhelm Gottlieb Leopold Fuckel